List of karateka includes notable practitioners of karate, listed in alphabetical order by surname. Note that Japanese name order might not be consistent in this list, due to differing conventions. Individual entries list each person's name, years of birth and death (as appropriate), and main karate style(s).

A 

Keigo Abe (born 1938), Shotokan
Rafael Aghayev (born 1985), Shotokan
Gary Alexander, Isshin Ryu
Seishō Arakaki (1840–1918), Tode
Steve Arneil (born 1934), Kyokushin
Mark Arnott (born 1950), American Kenpo
Tetsuhiko Asai (1935–2006), Shotokan
Ankō Asato (1827–1906), Shuri-te
Linden Ashby (born 1960), style unspecified
Hideyuki Ashihara (1944–1995), Kyokushin and Ashihara
Elisa Au (born 1981), Shitō-ryū
Akshay Kumar (born 1967), Gōjū-ryū

B 

Xhavit Bajrami (born 1975), Seido
Shaun Baker, Shotokan
Christine Bannon-Rodrigues (born 1966) Oki-ryu
Vitor Belfort (born 1977), Shotokan
Steven Bellamy (born 1950), Wadō-ryū and Gōjū-ryū
Randy Blake (born 1986), style unspecified
Billy Blanks (born 1955), style unspecified
Jon Bluming (1933–2018), Kyokushin
Mitchell Bobrow (born 1950), Shūdōkan, Tang Soo Do
Robert Bowles, Shuri-ryū
Frank Brennan (born 1960), Shotokan
Steve Blackman (born 1963), Shotokan

C 

Jose Canseco (born 1964), style unspecified
Thomas Carroll (1938–1999), Shotokan
Shonie Carter (born 1971), Shidōkan
Antonio Carvalho (born 1979), Shotokan
Chris Casamassa (born 1965), Shōrin-ryū
Graciela Casillas, American Kenpo
Juan Eduardo Castro dos Santos (born 1954), Okinawa-ken Ryu
Tino Ceberano (born c. 1942), Gōjū Kai
Nicholas Raymond Cerio (1936–1998), American Kenpo
Sonny Chiba (born 1939), Kyokushin
Chōshin Chibana (1885–1969), Shōrin-ryū
Teruo Chinen (born 1941), Gōjū-ryū
Peter Chong (born 1941), Kyokushin
William Kwai Sun Chow (1914–1987), American Kenpo
Randall "Tex" Cobb (born 1950), style unspecified
Howard Collins (born 1949), Kyokushin
Dale Cook (born 1958), style unspecified
Harry Cook (born 1949), Shotokan and Gōjū-ryū
John Corcoran, Shōrin-ryū
Joe Corley (born 1947), style unspecified
John Critzos II, style unspecified
Sean Connery (1930–2020), Kyokushin

D 

Raymond Daniels (born 1980), Kenpō Karate, Shotokan
Count Dante (1939–1975), style unspecified
Fumio Demura (born 1938), Shitō-ryū
Nick Denis (born 1983), Kyokushin
George Dillman, Ryukyu Kempo
Richard K. Diran (born 1949), style unspecified
Ticky Donovan (born 1947), Shotokan, Wadō-ryū, and Kyokushin
Troy Dorsey (born 1962), style unspecified

E 

Héctor Echavarría (born 1969), American Kenpo and Shuri-ryū
Shigeru Egami (1912–1981), Shōtōkai
Adriano Directo Emperado (1926–2009), American Kenpo
Keinosuke Enoeda (1935–2003), Shotokan

F 

Glaube Feitosa (born 1973), Kyokushin
Francisco Filho (born 1971), Kyokushin
Sean Patrick Flanery (born 1965), style unspecified
Michael G. Foster (born 1940), Yoshukai
Jason David Frank (born 1973), Shotokan
Zane Frazier (born 1966), American Kenpo
Travis Fulton (1977–2021), American Kenpo
Gichin Funakoshi (1869–1957), Shotokan
Gigō Funakoshi (1906–1945), Shotokan

G 

Manny Gamburyan (born 1981), Kyokushin
Alexander Gerunov (born 1979), Shitō-ryū
John Giordano (martial artist), Gōjū-ryū
Glacier (born 1964), style unspecified
Lyman Good (born 1985), style unspecified
Peter Graham (born 1975), Kyokushin
Thomas Ian Griffith (born 1962), American Kenpo
Sam Greco (born 1967), Kyokushin
Neil Grove (born 1971), Gōjū-ryū
Shinpan Gusukuma (1890–1954), Shitō-ryū
Bear Grylls (born 1974), Shotokan
Johnny Gyro, style unspecified

H 

Keith Hackney (born 1958), American Kenpo
Mitsusuke Harada (born 1928), Shotokan
Randall Hassell (born c. 1940), Shotokan
Demetrius Havanas (1950-1981), style unspecified
Dave Hazard (born 1952), Shotokan
Dana Hee (born 1961), Shotokan
Sekō Higa (1898–1966), Gōjū-ryū
Yuchoku Higa (1910–1994), Shōrin-ryū and Gōjū-ryū
Kanryō Higaonna (1853–1915), Gōjū-ryū
Kanryu Higaonna (1849–1922), Okinawan martial arts
Morio Higaonna (born 1938), Gōjū-ryū
Kori Hisataka (1907–1988), Shorinjiryu Kenkokan
Masayuki Hisataka (born 1940), Shorinjiryu Kenkokan
Steven Ho (born 1973), style unspecified
Sam Hoger (born 1980), style unspecified
Russ Hogue (born 1974), style unspecified
Loek Hollander (born c. 1940), Kyokushin
Mark Holst (born 1984), Shotokan
Kyoji Horiguchi (born 1990), Shotokan
Andy Hug (1964–2000), Kyokushin and Seido

I 

Kazuyoshi Ishii (born 1953), Seido
Ankō Itosu (1832–1916), Shuri-te

K 

Nobuaki Kakuda (born 1961), Seido
Hirokazu Kanazawa (1931–2019), Shotokan
Taiji Kase (1929–2004), Shotokan
Hajime Kazumi (born 1971), Kyokushin
Ömer Kemaloğlu (born 1987), style unspecified
Dave Kershaw (born 1955), Shotokan
Katsunori Kikuno (born 1981), Kyokushin
Richard Kim (1917–2001), Shōrinji-ryū
Davit Kiria (born 1988), Ashihara
Taishin Kohiruimaki (born 1977), Kyokushin
Yuki Kondo (born 1975), Shorinji Kempo
Takayuki Kubota (born 1934), Te and Gosoku-ryu
Shōgō Kuniba (1935–1992), Shitō-ryū
Yasuaki Kurata (born 1946), Shito-ryu
Chōtoku Kyan (1870–1945), Shōrin-ryū

L 

Maximiliano Larrosa (born 1992)
Joe Lewis (born 1944), Shōrin-ryū
Chuck Liddell (born 1969), American Kenpo
Bobby Lowe (1929–2011), Kyokushin
Dolph Lundgren (born 1957), Kyokushin

M 

Kenwa Mabuni (1889–1952), Shitō-ryū
Lyoto Machida (born 1978), Shotokan
John Makdessi (born 1985), Shotokan
Akira Masuda (born 1962), Kyokushin
Shokei Matsui (born 1963), Kyokushin
Sōkon Matsumura (c. 1800–c. 1890), Shuri-te
Chuck Merriman (born c. 1940), Gōjū-ryū
Kenji Midori (born 1962), Kyokushin
Takayuki Mikami (born 1933), Shotokan
Miyuki Miura (born 1949), Shotokan and Kyokushin
Frank Mir (born 1979), Kenpō
Chōjun Miyagi (1888–1953), Gōjū-ryū
Katsuya Miyahira (born 1918), Shōrin-ryū Shidōkan
Ei'ichi Miyazato (1922–1999), Gōjū-ryū
Minoru Mochizuki (1907–2003), Shotokan and Yoseikan
Vic Moore (born 1943), Shuri-ryū
Chōki Motobu (1871–1944), Shuri-te
Chōyū Motobu (1857–1938), Shuri-te
Matt Mullins (born 1980), Shōrei-ryū
Musashi (Akio Mori, born 1972), Seido
Glen Murphy (Born 1957) Kyokushin

N 

Shōshin Nagamine (1907–1997), Shōrin-ryū and Matsubayashi-ryū
Don Nagle (1938–1999), Isshin-ryu 
Tatsuya Naka (born 1964), Shotokan
Andrews Nakahara (born 1983), Kyokushin
Tadashi Nakamura (born 1942), Seidō juku
Masatoshi Nakayama (1913–1987), Shotokan
Shūgorō Nakazato (born 1921), Shōrin-ryū Shōrinkan
Jadamba Narantungalag (born (1975), Kyokushin
Gunnar Nelson (born 1988), Gōjū-ryū
Alain Ngalani (born 1975), Kyokushin
Jōkō Ninomiya (born 1954), Enshin
Hidetaka Nishiyama (1928–2008), Shotokan
Masaaki Noiri (born 1993), Shin
Chuck Norris  (born 1940), Tang Soo Do

O 

Hideo Ochi (born 1940), Shotokan
Tsutomu Ohshima (born 1930), Shotokan
Teruyuki Okazaki (born 1931), Shotokan
Terry O'Neill (born 1948), Shotokan
Hironori Ōtsuka (1892–1982), Wadō-ryū
Masutatsu Ōyama (1923–1994), Kyokushin

P 

Ed Parker (1931–1990), American Kenpo
Cecil Patterson (1930–2002), Wadō-ryū
Seth Petruzelli (born 1979), Shitō-ryū
Nicholas Pettas (born 1973), Kyokushin
Malcolm Phipps (born 1942), Shotokan
Henry Plée (born 1923)
Karin Prinsloo (born 1972), JKA Shotokan

R 

Samuel Roberts (born 1956), Shotokan
Hatsuo Royama (born 1948), Kyokushin
Bas Rutten (born 1965), Kyokushin

S 

Tarec Saffiedine (born 1986), Shihaishinkai
Georges St-Pierre (born 1981), Kyokushin
Kanga Sakukawa (1733–1815), Te
Masaaki Satake (born 1965), Seido
Katsuaki Satō (born 1946), Satojuku
Semmy Schilt (born 1973), Ashihara
Andy Sherry (born 1943), Shotokan
Tatsuo Shimabuku (1908–1975), Gōjū-ryū and Isshin-ryū
Zenryō Shimabukuro (1908–1969), Shōrin-ryū Seibukan
Hiroshi Shirai (born 1937), Shotokan
Assuerio Silva (born 1974), Shotokan
Wesley Snipes (born 1962), Shotokan
Tiffany van Soest (born 1989), Shōrin-ryū
Paul Starling (born 1948), Gōjū-ryū
Shojiro Sugiyama (born 1929), Shotokan

T 

Kazumi Tabata (born 1943), Shotokan
Seigo Tada (1922–1997), Gōjū-ryū and Seigokan
Masaji Taira (born 1952), Gōjū-ryū
Peichin Takahara (1683–c. 1765), Te
Rina Takeda (born 1991), Ryukyu Shorin-ryu
Chōjirō Tani (1921–1998), Shūkōkai
Ewerton Teixeira (born 1982), Kyokushin
George Spiro Thanos (born 1952), Taekwondo
Geoff Thompson (born 1960), Shotokan
Stephen Thompson (born 1983), American Kenpo
Seikichi Toguchi (1917–1998), Gōjū-ryū
Kenji Tokitsu (born 1947), Shotokan
Kanken Tōyama (1888–1966), Shūdōkan
Robert Trias (1923–1989), Shuri-ryū
Masami Tsuruoka (born 1929), Chitō-ryū
Ashraf Tai, (career 1974–1985) Shotokan

U 

Kanbun Uechi (1877–1948), Uechi-ryū
Sadamu Uriu (born 1929), Shotokan

V 

Luca Valdesi (born 1976), Shotokan
Dominique Valera (born 1947), Shotokan
Jean-Claude Van Damme (born 1960), Shotokan
Will Vanders (born 1963), Kyokushin and Shotokan

W 

Atsuko Wakai (born 1971), Seigokan and Gōjū-ryū
Bill Wallace (born 1945), Shōrin-ryū
Shunji Watanabe (born 1938), Shorinjiryu Kenkokan
John van Weenen (born 1941), Shotokan
Michael Jai White (born 1967), Kyokushin, Shotokan, and Gōjū-ryū
Arturo Worrell (born 1950), Shotokan
Ronnie Watt (born 1947), Shotokan

Y 

James Yabe  (born 1941), Shotokan
Kentsū Yabu (1866–1937), Shōrin-ryū
Meitoku Yagi (1912–2003), Gōjū-ryū
Yutaka Yaguchi (born 1932), Shotokan
Gōgen Yamaguchi (1909–1989), Gōjū Kai
Masahiro Yamamoto (born 1983), Kyokushin
Tadashi Yamashita (born 1942), Shorin-Ryu
Terutomo Yamazaki (born 1947), Kyokushin
Tony Young (born 1962), Gōjū-ryū

 
Lists of martial artists
Karate-related lists